Susan Miller (married name Susan Hunt) (born 19 May 1949) is a British model, dancer, and choreographer.  She has acted in several films such as Twenty Nine (1969) and The Wild Geese (1978).  Miller gained notoriety for being married to Formula 1 race driver James Hunt (in 1974), and leaving him for Richard Burton in 1976.

Biography 
Miller grew up in Southern Rhodesia (modern Zimbabwe) with her parents, a twin sister and a brother. By the age of 24, she was a successful fashion model in Britain. She was known for being one of the "beautiful people" and for getting whatever she wanted easily. In 1974, she met Hunt in Spain. He proposed to her only weeks later, and they were married the same year. The couple were considered "one of the sporting world's most happily married couples."  

The couple spent their honeymoon in Antigua with one of Hunt's close friends, also newly married, and then settled in Spain for tax reasons. Later, Miller described feeling that Hunt's career came ahead of everything else in his life. He was also frequently unfaithful and the marriage floundered. 

In December 1975, Burton met Miller at a Swiss ski resort and invited her to return to New York with him. Their relationship developed quickly and Burton left Elizabeth Taylor for Miller. Burton allegedly paid Hunt $1 million as part of the divorce settlement between Hunt and Miller.  

Miller claimed that part of the reason she initially became involved with Burton was so that she could make Hunt jealous. Miller divorced Hunt in Haiti in June 1976. After her divorce from Hunt, she and Burton had a honeymoon of sorts, and were married in August 1976 in Arlington, Virginia, U.S. During their marriage, Miller was reported to be jealous of Burton's ex-wife Taylor. An interesting anecdote involves Miller's jealous insistence that, while Burton was appearing in a revival of Camelot in Toronto, a page from the program displaying an advertisement of Taylor's jewelry line must be removed from every copy or Burton would not go on.  Trying to keep peace with his wife, Burton acquiesced and the theatre's staff had to remove the offending page from thousands of copies of the program.  The marriage between Burton and Miller ended in their 1982 divorce, which was settled in Haiti. 

Miller married a third time, to American millionaire Jack Cawood, a real estate developer in Puerto Vallarta, Mexico, and the couple moved to the United States. 

Ron Howard's 2013 film, Rush recounts the intrigues surrounding her former husband, Hunt, and the role of Miller is played by Olivia Wilde. At the time, it was reported that Miller was living on the Spanish island of Ibiza.

Filmography

Acting roles
Twenty Nine (1969) - as Priscilla
The Wild Geese (1978) - as Egyptian Girl Flirting with Faulkner

References

External links

Susan Hunt on BFI

Living people
British female models
1949 births
Place of birth missing (living people)
Racing drivers' wives and girlfriends